Greer Lascelles Twiss  (born 23 June 1937) is a New Zealand sculptor, and in 2011 was the recipient of an Icon Award from the Arts Foundation of New Zealand, limited to 20 living art-makers.

Career 
Twiss was born in Auckland on 23 June 1937, and graduated from Elam School of Fine Arts in 1960 with a Diploma of Fine Arts with honours. In 1965, he received a QEII Arts Council Travel Grant, which he used to study lost-wax casting in Europe. He is best known for his works in bronze. In 1966, he was appointed as a lecturer at Elam, and he eventually became the head of sculpture there in 1974. He retired in 1998.

Works 
His works are in the Auckland Art Gallery Toi o Tāmaki. He has participated in many exhibitions including Volume and Form, Singapore; Content/Context at Shed 11 - Museum of New Zealand Te Papa Tongarewa; and Aspects of Recent New Zealand Art, Auckland City Art Gallery. He has been the subject of two retrospective presentations by the City Gallery Wellington and by the Auckland Art Gallery. His work, Flight Trainer for Albatross, stands at the entrance of the Auckland viaduct on Princes Wharf. and his large-scale bronze Karangahape Road Fountain has been a fixture of Pigeon Park at the intersection of Karangahape Road and Symonds Street since 1969.

Honours and recognition 
Twiss was a guest contributor to the sculpture park at the Seoul Olympics. In the 2002 Queen's Birthday and Golden Jubilee Honours, Twiss was appointed an Officer of the New Zealand Order of Merit for services to sculpture, and in 2011 he received an Arts Foundation Icon Award.

References 

1937 births
Living people
Artists from Auckland
Elam Art School alumni
Academic staff of the University of Auckland
New Zealand sculptors
Officers of the New Zealand Order of Merit